The AVC qualification for the 2014 FIVB Volleyball Women's World Championship saw member nations compete for four places at the finals in Italy.

Draw
16 AVC national teams entered qualification. (North Korea later withdrew) The teams were distributed according to their geographical positions. Teams ranked 1–5 in FIVB World Rankings do not compete in the zonal rounds, and automatically qualify for the final round. Australia and New Zealand also qualified automatically since no other team registered in Oceania zone.

Berths for final round

Zonal round

Final round

The ten remaining teams were distributed according to their position in the FIVB Senior Women's Rankings as of 23 January 2013 using the serpentine system for their distribution. (Rankings shown in brackets)

Zonal round

Central
Venue:  Nakhon Pathom Sports Center Gymnasium, Nakhon Pathom, Thailand
Dates: June 26, 2013
All times are Indochina Time (UTC+07:00)

|}

|}

Eastern
Venue:  Taipei Gymnasium, Taipei, Taiwan
Dates: June 28, 2013
All times are Chungyuan Standard Time (UTC+08:00)

|}

|}

Southeastern
Venue:  Hướng Hóa Gymnasium, Khe Sanh, Vietnam
Dates: June 14–16, 2013
All times are Indochina Time (UTC+07:00)

|}

|}

Final round

Pool A
Venue:  Park Arena, Komaki, Japan
Dates: September 4–8, 2013
All times are Japan Standard Time (UTC+09:00)

|}

|}

Pool B
Venue:  Chenzhou Olympic Sports Centre, Chenzhou, China
Dates: September 27– October 1, 2013
All times are China Standard Time (UTC+08:00)

|}

|}

References 

2014 FIVB Volleyball Women's World Championship
2013 in volleyball
FIVB Volleyball World Championship qualification